John Milford Rutter  (born 24 September 1945) is an English composer, conductor, editor, arranger, and record producer, mainly of choral music.

Biography
Born on 24 September 1945 in London, the son of an industrial chemist and his wife, Rutter grew up living over the Globe pub on London's Marylebone Road. He was educated at Highgate School where fellow pupils included John Tavener, Howard Shelley, Brian Chapple and Nicholas Snowman, and as a chorister there took part in the first (1963) recording of Britten's War Requiem under the composer's baton. He then read music at Clare College, Cambridge, where he was a member of the choir. While still an undergraduate, he had his first compositions published, including the Shepherd's Pipe Carol. He served as director of music at Clare College from 1975 to 1979 and led the choir to international prominence.

In 1981, Rutter founded his own choir, the Cambridge Singers, which he conducts and with which he has made many recordings of sacred choral repertoire (including his own works), particularly under his own label Collegium Records. He resides at Hemingford Abbots in Cambridgeshire and frequently conducts many choirs and orchestras around the world.

From 1985 to 1992, Rutter suffered severely from myalgic encephalomyelitis (ME, or chronic fatigue syndrome), which restricted his output; after 1985, he stopped writing music on commission, as he was unable to guarantee meeting deadlines.

Rutter also works as an arranger and editor. As a young man, he collaborated with Sir David Willcocks on five volumes of the extraordinarily successful Carols for Choirs anthology series.

He was inducted as a National Patron of Delta Omicron, an international professional music fraternity in 1985. Rutter is also a Vice-President of the Joyful Company of Singers, President of The Bach Choir, and President of the Association of British Choral Directors (ABCD).

Compositions
Rutter's compositions are chiefly choral, and include Christmas carols, anthems and extended works such as the Gloria, the Requiem and the Magnificat.

The world premiere of Rutter's Requiem (1985), and of his authoritative edition of Fauré's Requiem, took place with the Fox Valley Festival Chorus, in Illinois. In 2002, his setting of Psalm 150, commissioned for the Queen's Golden Jubilee, was performed at the Jubilee thanksgiving service in St Paul's Cathedral, London. Similarly, he was commissioned to write a new anthem, "This is the day", for the wedding of Prince William and Catherine Middleton in 2011, performed at Westminster Abbey during the service.

Rutter's work is published by Oxford University Press. It has been recorded by many choirs, but he conducts his own recordings principally on his label Collegium Records.

The first two choral items sung at the Platinum Jubilee National Service of Thanksgiving in June 2022 were arrangements by Rutter.

Influences
Rutter's music is eclectic, showing the influences of the French and English choral traditions of the early 20th century as well as of light music and American classic songwriting. Almost every choral anthem and hymn that he writes has a subsequent orchestral accompaniment in addition to the standard piano/organ accompaniment, using various different instrumentations such as strings only, strings and woodwinds or full orchestra with brass and percussion. Many of his works have also been arranged for concert band with optional chorus.

Despite composing and conducting much religious music, Rutter told the US television programme 60 Minutes in 2003 that he was not a particularly religious man yet still deeply spiritual and inspired by the spirituality of sacred verses and prayers. The main topics considered in the 60 Minutes programme, which was broadcast a week before Christmas 2003, were Rutter's popularity with choral groups in the United States, Britain, and other parts of the world, and his composition Mass of the Children (written after the sudden death of his son Christopher while a student at Clare College, Cambridge, where Rutter himself had studied).

In a 2009 interview, Rutter discussed his understanding of "genius" and its unique ability to transform lives – whether that genius is communicated in the form of music or other media. He likened the purity of music to that of mathematics and connected the two with a reference to the discovery made by the early Greeks that frequencies of harmonic pitches are related by whole-number ratios.

Reception
Rutter's music is very popular, particularly in the US. In the UK, many hold him in high regard, as illustrated by the following quotation from a review in the London Evening Standard (25 September 2005): "For the infectiousness of his melodic invention and consummate craftsmanship, Rutter has few peers".  Sue Lawley referred to Rutter as "the most celebrated and successful composer of carols alive today" and Sean Rafferty heralded Rutter as "a creator of not just carols, but wonderfully great things for the human voice." One British composer, David Arditti, did not regard him as a sufficiently "serious" composer, saying that Rutter is "hard to take seriously, because of the way in which his sheer technical facility or versatility leads to a superficial, unstable crossover style which is neither quite classical nor pop, and which tends towards mawkish sentimentality in his sugarily-harmonised and orchestrated melodies." The Guardian remarked that "it is as a writer of carols that he has really made his mark ... His larger-scale works – particularly the Gloria (1974), Requiem (1985) and Magnificat (1990) – are also well established in the choral repertoire." David Willcocks considered Rutter "the most gifted composer of his generation."

Recognition
In 1980 Rutter was made an honorary fellow of Westminster Choir College in Princeton, New Jersey, and in 1988 he became a fellow of the Guild of Church Musicians. In 1996 the Archbishop of Canterbury conferred a Lambeth Doctorate of Music upon him in recognition of his contribution to church music. 

Rutter was made a Commander of the Order of the British Empire (CBE) in the 2007 New Year Honours, for services to music.

In 2008 he also became an honorary Bencher of the Middle Temple while playing a significant role in the 2008 Temple Festival.

List of compositions and arrangements

Extended compositions 

 Suite for Strings (1973) 
 Gloria (1974)
Bang! (opera, 1975)
 The Beatles Concerto (1977)
 Suite Antique (1979)
 Requiem (1985)
 Magnificat (1990)
 Te Deum (1990)
 Mass of the Children (2003)
 The Gift of Life: Six Canticles of Creation (2015)
 Visions (2016)

Carols 

 "All Bells in Paradise" (original composition)
 "Angels' Carol" (original composition)
 "Angel Tidings" (arrangement)
 "Born on Earth" (arrangement)
 "Candlelight Carol" (original composition)
 "Carol of the Children" (original composition)
 "Carol of the Magi" (original composition)
 "Cantique de Noël" (arrangement)
 "Child in a Manger" (arrangement of Gaelic melody 'Bunessan', original words)
 "Christ our Emmanuel" (original composition)
 "Christmas Lullaby"
 "Christmas Night" (arrangement, the title song on the Cambridge Singers's first album)
 "Deck the Hall" (arrangement)
 "The Donkey Carol" (not to be confused with the song "The Friendly Beasts" arranged by John Davis that also goes by the nickname Donkey Carol)
 "Dormi Jesu"
 "Es Ist Ein’ Ros’ Entsprungen" (original composition)
 "I Sing of a Maiden" (original composition)
 "I Wish You Christmas"
 "Jesus Child"
 "Joseph’s Carol" (original composition)
 "Joy to the World" (arrangement)
 "Love Came Down at Christmas" (arrangement)
 "Mary's Lullaby"
 "Nativity Carol" (1st line: "Born in a Stable so Bare"; original composition)
 "Personent Hodie" (arrangement)
 "Hajej, nynej, Ježíšku" (arrangement and translation of Czech carol called "Hajej, nynej, Ježíšku")
 "Rejoice and Be Merry"
 "Shepherd's Pipe Carol"
 "Silent Night" (arrangement)
 "Star Carol"
 "Suzi's Carol" (original composition)
 "There is a Flower" (original composition)
 "The Twelve Days of Christmas" (arrangement)
 "The Very Best Time of Year"
 "Up Good Christen Folk"
 "We Will"
 "We Wish You a Merry Christmas" (arrangement)
 "Wexford Carol" (arrangement)
 "Was I the lamb?" Setting of words by Marc Bratcher to celebrate the Chaplain's 20 years of service as Chaplain of Merton College.
 "What Sweeter Music"
 "Wild Wood Carol"

Other anthems 

 "All Things Bright and Beautiful (Rutter)", setting the hymn
 "Banquet Fugue"
 "Born on Earth (Rutter)", arrangement of the song
 "For the beauty of the earth", setting the hymn
 "I Wonder as I Wander (Rutter)", arrangement of the Christmas carol
 "Look at the world"

Choral works 

 Three Carols from Carols for Choirs 4 for SS and SSA unaccompanied
 Five Childhood Lyrics
 Eight Christmas Carols, Set 1 for mixed voices and piano
 Eight Christmas Carols, Set 2 for mixed voices and piano
 Twelve Christmas Carols, Set 1 for mixed voices and small orchestra or piano
 Twelve Christmas Carols, Set 2 for mixed voices and small orchestra or piano
 "The Twelve Days of Christmas" from Carols for Choirs 2 for soprano, alto, tenor and bass voices ("SATB") and piano or orchestra
 100 Carols for Choirs ed. Willcocks and Rutter
 Birthday Madrigals for SATB, commissioned in 1995 by Brian Kay and the Cheltenham Bach Choir to celebrate the 75th birthday of George Shearing
Canticles of America
 Carols for Choirs 2 ed. Willcocks and Rutter
 Carols for Choirs 3 ed. Willcocks and Rutter
 Carols for Choirs 4 ed. Willcocks and Rutter
 Child in a manger from Carols for Choirs 3 for SATB and keyboard or orchestra
 Christiana Canticles (Evening Service in C) for SATB and organ, consisting of the Magnificat and Nunc dimittis, and dedicated to the choir of Christ Church, Christiana Hundred 
 Christmas Night for SATB and keyboard or strings
 Come Down, O Love Divine for double mixed choir and organ
 Cradle Song from Carols for Choirs 3 for SATB unaccompanied
 Dancing Day for SSA with harp or piano
 Donkey Carol for SATB and piano or orchestra
 Flemish Carol from Carols for Choirs 3 for SATB and piano or orchestra
 "A Flower Remembered" for SATB or SAA, published with lyrics in both English and Japanese, composed in 2014 to commemorate the victims of the 2011 Tōhoku earthquake and tsunami
 For the Beauty of the Earth for SATB, SA, or TTBB, and piano
 A Gaelic Blessing for SATB and organ or guitar, commissioned in 1978 by the Chancel Choir of the First United Methodist Church, Omaha, Nebraska, in honour of minister of music Mel Olson
 Gloria for mixed voices with brass, percussion and organ or orchestra
 Here We Come a-wassailing from Twelve Christmas Carols, Set 1
 The Holly and the Ivy for SATB and piano or orchestra
 I Saw Three Ships from Carols for Choirs 3 for SATB and piano or orchestra
 "I will sing with the spirit" for SATB and organ, piano or orchestra
 Jesus Child for SATB and piano or orchestra
 Jesus Child for unison and piano
 Joy to the world! for SATB and keyboard or orchestra (2 trumpets, timpani and strings)
 King Jesus hath a garden from Carols for Choirs 3 for SATB and piano or flute, harp and strings
 "Kum ba yah" - a reflective arrangement of the traditional African-American song, written in memory of Nelson Mandela.
 "Look at the World" for SATB and Orchestra
 "The Lord bless you and keep you"
 Lord, Make Me an Instrument of Thy Peace for SATB or TTBB with organ or harp and strings
 Love came down at Christmas for SATB and keyboard or strings
 Mary's Lullaby for SATB and piano or orchestra
 Nativity Carol for SATB and keyboard or strings
 O come, O come, Emmanuel from Twelve Christmas Carols, Set 1 for SATB and keyboard or orchestra
 O Lord, thou hast searched me out for SATB chorus, organ and solo cor anglais (or clarinet, or viola)
 "Psalmfest"
 Quem pastores laudavere for SATB unaccompanied
 Quittez, pasteurs for SATB unaccompanied
 Shall I compare thee to a summer's day? for SATB unaccompanied
 Shepherd's Pipe Carol for SATB and piano or orchestra or for SSAA and piano or orchestra
 Sing we to this merry company for SATB and orchestra or organ
 Star Carol for SATB and piano or orchestra or brass with optional children's voices or for unison and piano
 There is a flower (original composition) for SATB unaccompanied
 Tomorrow shall be my dancing day from the cycle of carols, Dancing Day for SSA and harp or piano
 Wexford Carol for SATB unaccompanied
 What sweeter music for SATB and organ or strings
 Winchester Te Deum For SATB and Piano or Organ

Anthems and other compositions 
Most of these works are original compositions, including new musical settings of standard texts, whilst others are arrangements of traditional hymns.

Music with narration 
  Setting of The Wind in the Willows for narrator, SATB chorus and chamber orchestra
  Brother Heinrich's Christmas
  The Reluctant Dragon

Piano music 
 The John Rutter Piano Album : arrangements of eight of his most popular choral pieces for solo piano.
 The John Rutter Christmas Piano Album : eight piano arrangements of Christmas pieces composed by Rutter.

References

Footnotes

Sources
Kennedy, Michael (2006), The Oxford Dictionary of Music, 985 pages,

Further reading
Burrows, Helen Jane (1999). Choral Music and the Church of England 1970–1995: A Study of Selected Works and Composer–Church Relations. PhD thesis.  Norwich: University of East Anglia.
Dakers, Lionel (1978). Making Church Music Work. Oxford and London: Mowbray.
Frank, Alan (1976). "John Rutter's Partita for Orchestra". The Musical Times 117, no. 1598 (April): 309.
Morrison, Richard (1992). "Tis the Season to Be Authentic". The Times (3 November): 29.
Westermeyer, Paul (1994). "John Rutter: Popular Romantic". Christian Century 111, no. 35 (7 December): 1158.

External links

 
 Rutter at the Oxford University Press website
 John Rutter interviewed by Alan Macfarlane, 28 January 2009 (video)
 
 John Rutter interviewed by C Music TV, October 2010 from C Music TV
 This is the Day, performed at the royal wedding, 2011
 Interview with John Rutter, 11 July 1991

1945 births
20th-century classical composers
20th-century English musicians
21st-century classical composers
21st-century English musicians
Alumni of Clare College, Cambridge
Classical composers of church music
Commanders of the Order of the British Empire
EMI Classics and Virgin Classics artists
English agnostics
English classical composers
English conductors (music)
British male conductors (music)
English male classical composers
Ivor Novello Award winners
Light music composers
Living people
People educated at Highgate School
People with chronic fatigue syndrome
20th-century British composers
21st-century British composers
20th-century British conductors (music)
21st-century British conductors (music)
English choral conductors